ARL may refer to:

Military
 US Navy hull classification symbol for repair ship
 Admiralty Research Laboratory, UK
 United States Army Research Laboratory
 ARL 44, a WWII French tank

Organizations
 Aero Research Limited, a UK adhesives company
 Air Resources Laboratory of US NOAA
 Association of Research Libraries, US and Canada
 Pennsylvania State University Applied Research Laboratory, US
 Animal Rescue League of Western Pennsylvania, US

Sports
 Albanian Rugby League
 Auckland Rugby League
 Australian Rugby League

Transportation
 Airport Rail Link (Bangkok), Thailand
 Autolinee Regionali Luganesi, Swiss bus company
 Arlesey railway station (National Rail code), UK
 Armour Refrigerator Line, a refrigerator car line
 Arly Airport (IATA airport code), Burkina Faso

Computing
 Authority revocation list, in cryptosystems

Other 
 Argyll, historic county in Scotland, Chapman code